Trịnh Mai Trang (born 1986, in Hanoi) known as Trang Trịnh, is a Vietnamese pianist.

Trang Trinh started musical training aged 4 in Hanoi. She moved to England to study and later graduated from the Royal Academy of Music, London with distinction in 2010 and made her debut in Hanoi Opera House - a concert titled "Piano's Journal" or "Piano's Diary". This concert was particularly noted because of her using other media form (video, voice-over, photography) in her piano creative piano recital.

Trang Trinh is also known for helping underprivileged children to access music education 

In November 2011, she returned to the stage of L'espace for another sold-out concert.
She has appeared together with Edward Gardner in a concerto performance in London, played for Jean Bernard-Pommier in his Beethoven Unwrapped Masterclass in King's Place, London and performed in Europe.

She was awarded the Sterndale Bennett Scholarship, and the Gretta Parkinson Prize in 2007 for her musical achievement in the Royal Academy of Music.

Trang Trinh is married to South Korean Tenor Park Sung Min in May, 2012.

References

External links 

 Official Website
 Solo debut news Talk Vietnam
 Vietnamnet news about Piano's Journal
 News about L'espace concert
 Trang Trinh joins leading Vietnamese artist in summer concert
 The story of Nguyen Van Tu the blind pianist and how he received help from Trang Trinh

1986 births
Living people
Vietnamese pianists
21st-century pianists